Lycengraulis is a genus of anchovies containing four recognized species. They are restricted to the Western Hemisphere in the waters in and around Central America and South America.

Species
There are currently five recognized species in this genus:
 Lycengraulis batesii (Günther, 1868) (Bates' sabretooth anchovy)
 Lycengraulis figueiredoi Loeb & Alcântara, 2013
 Lycengraulis grossidens (Agassiz, 1829) (Atlantic sabretooth anchovy)
 Lycengraulis limnichthys L. P. Schultz, 1949
 Lycengraulis poeyi (Kner, 1863) (Pacific sabretooth anchovy)

References

Anchovies
Ray-finned fish genera
Taxa named by Albert Günther